Muddy Fork is a stream in Knox County in the U.S. state of Missouri. It is a tributary of the North Fork Salt River.

Muddy Fork was so named on account of the character of the water.

See also
List of rivers of Missouri

References

Rivers of Knox County, Missouri
Rivers of Missouri